Ptuj City Stadium is a multi-use stadium in Ptuj, Slovenia. It is currently used mostly for football matches. The stadium has a capacity of 1,592 seats.

See also
List of football stadiums in Slovenia

References

External links
Ptuj City Stadium at sport-ptuj.si

Football venues in Slovenia
Multi-purpose stadiums in Slovenia
City Stadium
Sports venues completed in 1954
1954 establishments in Slovenia